The 1994 WAFL season was the 110th season of the West Australian Football League in its various incarnations.

It was the final season before, to stem fears of dominance by the Eagles of the AFL, a second Western Australian team, the Fremantle Dockers was added to the national competition. Along with financial difficulties faced by perennial stragglers Perth and to a lesser extent West Perth, East Perth, Swan Districts and on-field power club Claremont, this made the league consider substantial measures to deal with the declining popularity of the competition. The 1994 season did see two home-and-away attendances of over ten thousand for the last time in the competition's history.

With president Tom James admitting that if the Falcons remained based in the aging districts of Daglish and Shenton Park, the club would be extinct by 2000, West Perth took the league to the rapidly growing northwestern suburbs of the city by moving to Arena Joondalup in a newly developing region of the city, vacating Leederville Oval for six seasons until the redevelopment of Perth Oval as a rectangular soccer field for the Perth Glory forced the Falcons’ traditional rivals East Perth to move there. The 1994 season also saw the last WAFL games at the Western Australian Cricket Association Ground, due to redevelopment of the drainage and grandstands of Subiaco Oval during this and the early part of the 1995 season.

Another notable feature was the first converts to Australian Rules from basketball, Daniel Bandy and Leon Harris, who debuted for Perth and East Perth respectively. Bandy was to be a mainstay for the Dockers during their early years in the AFL.

Home-and-away season

Round 1 (Easter weekend)

Round 2

Round 3

Round 4 (Anzac Day)

Round 5

Round 6

Round 7

Round 8

Round 9

Round 10 (Foundation Day)

Round 11

Round 12

Round 13

Round 14

Round 15

Round 16

Round 17

Round 18

Round 19

Round 20

Round 21

Ladder

Finals

Elimination and Qualifying Finals

Semi-finals

Preliminary final

Grand Final

References

External links
Official WAFL website
West Australian Football League Season 1994

West Australian Football League seasons
WAFL